John Augustus Bolles (April 16, 1809 – May 25, 1878) was an American politician who, from 1843–1844, served as the Massachusetts Secretary of the Commonwealth. He also served as a staff officer in the Union Army during the American Civil War and was brevetted to Brigadier General. Bolles was the son of an abolitionist preacher and the brother in law of General John Adams Dix.  He was also an accomplished legal scholar prior to the war and advised the War Department on the legality of upholding the conviction of Clement Vallandigham.  Bolles had conducted the first broad study of the Dorr Rebellion as well as Chief Justice Taney's opinion in Luther v. Borden and concluded that the federal judiciary could not take jurisdiction over Vallandigham's appeals.  The judiciary sided with Bolles on this matter.

He was a member of the Boston Vigilance Committee, an organization that assisted fugitive slaves.

Death
Bolles died on May 25, 1878 in Washington, D.C., he was buried in Forest Hills Cemetery in the Jamaica Plain neighborhood of Boston, Massachusetts.

References

1809 births
Secretaries of the Commonwealth of Massachusetts
Massachusetts Whigs
19th-century American politicians
Brown University alumni
People from Ashford, Connecticut
People of Massachusetts in the American Civil War
1878 deaths
Union Army officers